The list includes all aviation accidents and incidents involving airliners in Norway that result in a write-off or fatalities, as well as all hijackings. Helicopter accidents are only included for multi-engined aircraft with fatalities. Military accidents are only included if they have fatalities. The list excludes all accidents during wartime involving military aircraft, which specifically includes the period 8 April 1940 to 8 May 1945. The location denotes current municipalities, which may differ from municipal borders at the time of the accident. Fatalities include people on the ground and people who die within thirty days because of injuries sustained from the accident.

Norway